Pseudotropheus tursiops is a species of cichlid endemic to Lake Malawi where it is only known from Chisumulu Island. This species can reach a length of  SL. It can also be found in the aquarium trade.

References

tursiops
Fish described in 1975
Taxonomy articles created by Polbot